Saint Guy may refer to:

 Saint Vitus, Sicilian saint
 Guy of Anderlecht, a Belgian saint
 Saint-Guy, Quebec, a municipality in Canada